Corey Edward Oswalt (born September 3, 1993) is an American professional baseball pitcher who is a free agent. He made his Major League Baseball (MLB) debut in 2018 with the New York Mets.

Career

Amateur career
Oswalt attended James Madison High School in San Diego, California. He was primarily an infielder in high school and initially committed to play college baseball at UC Santa Barbara. Oswalt was drafted by the New York Mets in the seventh round of the 2012 Major League Baseball draft.

Professional career
Oswalt made his professional debut with the Kingsport Mets and spent all of 2012 with the team, going 4–3 with an 8.15 ERA in 35.1 innings pitched, and he also pitched for them in 2013, compiling an 0–1 record and 3.46 ERA 13 innings. He played for the Brooklyn Cyclones in 2014, finishing 6–2 with a 2.26 ERA in 12 games (11 starts), Savannah Sand Gnats in 2015, going 11-5 with a 3.36 ERA in 25 games, and St. Lucie Mets and Gulf Coast League Mets in 2016, where he pitched to a combined 4–2 record and 4.06 ERA in 14 games (13 starts). After the 2016 season, Oswalt played in the Arizona Fall League. He spent 2017 with the Binghamton Rumble Ponies where he was 12–5 with a 2.28 ERA in 24 games started. The Mets added him to their 40-man roster after the 2017 season.

Oswalt began 2018 with the Las Vegas 51s and was promoted to the Mets on April 21. He made his Major League debut on April 25 at Busch Stadium against the St. Louis Cardinals, pitching 4.2 innings of relief, giving up two runs on two hits while striking out four and walking none in a 9–1 loss. On June 29, 2018, he made his first start for the Mets after Jacob deGrom was scratched. Oswalt only pitched in two games for the Mets in 2019, giving up 9 runs in 6.1 innings pitched. In 2020, Oswalt appeared in 4 games, giving up 7 runs in 13 innings pitched.

On February 10, 2021, Oswalt was designated for assignment by the Mets after the signing of Albert Almora was made official. On February 16, Oswalt was outrighted and invited to Spring Training as a non-roster invitee. On June 23, Oswalt was selected to the 40-man and active rosters. On July 19, Oswalt was placed on the 60-day injured list with right knee inflammation.
Oswalt made 3 appearances for the Mets in 2021, going 1-1 with a 3.48 ERA and 10 strikeouts. On October 29, Oswalt elected free agency.

San Francisco Giants
On January 14, 2022, Oswalt signed a minor league contract with the San Francisco Giants.

Philadelphia Phillies 
On May 8, 2022, Oswalt was acquired by the Philadelphia Phillies in a reported trade with the Giants for starting pitching depth. He was immediately assigned to the organization's Triple-A affiliate, the Lehigh Valley IronPigs.

Colorado Rockies
On July 3, 2022, Oswalt was traded to the Colorado Rockies in exchange for cash considerations. He elected free agency on November 10, 2022.

References

External links

1993 births
Living people
Baseball players from San Diego
Major League Baseball pitchers
New York Mets players
Kingsport Mets players
Brooklyn Cyclones players
Savannah Sand Gnats players
Gulf Coast Mets players
St. Lucie Mets players
Scottsdale Scorpions players
Binghamton Rumble Ponies players
Las Vegas 51s players
Syracuse Mets players
Sacramento River Cats players
Lehigh Valley IronPigs players